The Staveley Coal and Iron Company Limited was an industrial company based in Staveley, near Chesterfield, North Derbyshire.

History
The company was registered in 1863, appearing in provincial stock exchange reports from 1864. It exploited local ironstone quarried from land owned by the Duke of Devonshire on the outskirts of the village. It developed into coal mining, owning several collieries and also into chemical production, first from those available from coal tar distillation, later to cover a wide and diverse range. Part of the plant at Staveley was a sulphuric acid manufacturing unit making use of the Contact Process.

It was during the years of World War 1 that the company developed its chemical operations beyond coal-tar chemicals and began production of sulphuric and nitric acids. During the war they also made picric acid, TNT and guncotton. Following the end of hostilities the company laid plans to develop a range of chlorinated organics and to this end purchased salt-bearing land near  Sandbach, Cheshire. The salt was produced by a new company formed specifically for the purpose and named the British Soda Company. The salt being needed to feed a new installation of mercury cells at the Staveley works. The first cells at Staveley came into operation in 1922 and in 1926 they went into partnership with the Krebs Company of Paris and Berlin to develop a new cell, which was based on lessons learned. This was marketed worldwide as the Krebs-Staveley cell. This installation lasted into the late 1950s when the cellroom at Staveley was replaced with German-made mercury cells.

Another salt-related product was sodium chlorate. Staveley Coal and Iron Company were the first company in Britain to manufacture this chemical, with the plant becoming operational in 1938. In 1950, the Staveley Iron and Chemical Company was named by  Imperial Chemical Industries as one of their main competitors in caustic soda production.

In 1960, the Staveley Iron and Chemical Company, which had been  taken over by  Stewarts & Lloyds Limited was merged with the Ilkeston-based Stanton Iron Works to form Stanton and Staveley Ltd. In 1967, Stewarts and Lloyds became part of the nationalised British Steel Corporation, Stanton and Staveley were also incorporated.
   
By 1980, BSC sold off sections of the site as they divested themselves of non-core activities and by 2007 most of the former works at Staveley has been shut down and cleared. The last plant remaining was a p-aminophenol plant that produced active ingredients for paracetamol production. The site ceased production in June 2012, ending over 100 years of chemical production at Staveley. The site has since been demolished.

Eric Varley, a former Chesterfield Labour MP and cabinet minister, was an apprentice with the company after leaving school before becoming a trade union official and, much latter, Chairman of another local firm Coalite.

The location of the former works has due to be redeveloped as a infrastructure depot for phase 2B of the planned HS2 high speed railway due to open in 2033

References

External links
 Duke of Portland papers - related to coal leases (Derbyshire & Notts area)
 Photographs of the Last Remaining parts of the Staveley Coal and Iron Company

Coal companies of England
Chemical companies of England
Defunct energy companies of the United Kingdom
Ironworks and steelworks in England
Mining in Derbyshire
Companies based in Derbyshire
Energy companies established in 1863
Non-renewable resource companies established in 1863
Manufacturing companies disestablished in 1960
Non-renewable resource companies disestablished in 1960
1863 establishments in England
1960 disestablishments in England
Defunct companies of England
British companies established in 1863